Jorge Samuel Figueiredo Fernandes (born 30 January 1996), known as Joca, is a Portuguese professional footballer who plays for Rio Ave F.C. as a midfielder.

Club career

Braga
Born in Braga, Joca had two youth spells with local S.C. Braga, the last one starting at the age of 15. He made his senior debut with their reserves on 9 August 2014, coming on as a 76th-minute substitute in a 1–0 away loss against C.D. Tondela in the Segunda Liga; he went to spend three full seasons with the side, always in that division.

On 11 July 2017, after scoring a career-best 12 goals during the campaign with Braga B, Joca was loaned to Primeira Liga club Tondela. His first game in the competition occurred on 9 September, when he featured one minute in the 2–2 home draw with F.C. Paços de Ferreira.

Rio Ave
On 27 July 2018, Joca signed a three-year contract at Rio Ave F.C. also of the Portuguese top tier. On 30 January 2020, not being part of manager Carlos Carvalhal's plans, he was loaned to Leixões S.C. until June.

References

External links

Portuguese League profile 

1996 births
Living people
Sportspeople from Braga
Portuguese footballers
Association football midfielders
Primeira Liga players
Liga Portugal 2 players
S.C. Braga B players
C.D. Tondela players
Rio Ave F.C. players
Leixões S.C. players
Portugal youth international footballers